Ancistrus trinitatis is a dubious species of catfish in the family Loricariidae. It is known only from the Caribbean, where it occurs in freshwater environments on the island of Trinidad in Trinidad and Tobago. This species is of uncertain validity, as Theodore Gill referred to the type material in 1858 as Ancistrus guacharote (a species now referred to as Lasiancistrus guacharote) and it was later described by Albert Günther in 1864 as Chaetostomus trinitatis, but neither description is considered sufficient to determine the validity and identity of the taxon. While the original locality of the type material was listed as Puerto Rico, this was determined to be in error and the material was determined to have actually originated from the Maracaibo Basin of Venezuela. In 1946, Henry Weed Fowler described the species Ancistrus maracasae from Trinidad (which is the only confirmed loricariid species native to the island, aside from Hypostomus robinii, which is not known to have been taxonomically confused with any Ancistrus species), and in 2019, Lesley S. De Souza, Donald C. Taphorn, and Jonathan W. Armbruster determined that A. maracasae and A. trinitatis are synonymous, designating the holotype of A. maracasae as the neotype of A. trinitatis, although sources such as FishBase and ITIS list the two species as valid but separate.

References 

Fish described in 1864
trinitatis
Taxa named by Albert Günther